Guzmania weberbaueri is a plant species in the genus Guzmania. This species is native to Peru and Ecuador.

References

weberbaueri
Flora of Peru
Flora of Ecuador
Plants described in 1905